Eastwell is a hamlet and civil parish about  north of Ashford, Kent, England. The 2011 Census recorded the parish's population as 103.

The parish shares civil and church parish councils with neighbouring Boughton Aluph.

Parish church

Much of the medieval parish church of St Mary collapsed in 1951, and most of the ruins were demolished in 1956. Only the 15th-century west tower, the west wall of the south aisle and a 19th-century mortuary chapel remain standing. Since 1980 the remains have been a Scheduled Ancient Monument and cared for by the Friends of Friendless Churches charity.

Eastwell Park

Eastwell Park is a country estate almost one square mile in area surrounding Eastwell Manor, a Jacobethan country house completed in 1848. Eastwell Lake was created at the same time. The hotel offers a golf course, indoor swimming pool and horseriding.

Contemporary with the house is Eastwell Towers, a Jacobethan gatehouse in the adjacent parish of Boughton Aluph.

Lake House
Lake House is a late 13th-century house in Eastwell Park south of the manor house. It has a 17th-century roof and 19th-century windows, but retains four original windows, now blocked. It is a Grade II* listed building.

Notable inhabitants
By age of birth:
Richard Plantagenet (Richard of Eastwell) (1469–1550), purported son of King Richard III
Sir Thomas Moyle (1488–1560), Speaker of the House of Commons
Anne Finch, Countess of Winchilsea (1661–1720), poet and courtier
George Finch-Hatton, 11th Earl of Winchilsea (1815–1887), politician, and his family
Prince Alfred of Great Britain, Duke of Edinburgh (1866–1900), and his family

References

Further reading

External links

Civil parishes in Kent
Hamlets in Kent